Loc. cit. (Latin, short for loco citato, meaning "in the place cited") is a footnote or endnote term used to repeat the title and page number for a given work (and author). Loc. cit. is used in place of ibid. when the reference is not only to the work immediately preceding, but also refers to the same page. Therefore, loc. cit. is never followed by volume or page numbers. Loc. cit. may be contrasted with op. cit. (opere citato, "in the work cited"), in which reference is made to a work previously cited, but to a different page within that work.

Sample usage
 Example 1:

9. R. Millan, "Art of Latin grammar" (Academic, New York, 1997), p. 23.
10. Loc. cit.

In the above example, the loc. cit. in reference #10 refers to reference #9 in its entirety, including page number. Note that loc. cit. is capitalized in this instance.

 Example 2:

9. R. Millan, "Art of Latin grammar" (Academic, New York, 1997), p. 23.
10. G. Wiki, "Blah and its uses" (Blah Ltd., Old York, 2000), p. 12.
11. Millan, loc. cit.

In the second example, the loc. cit. in reference #11 refers to reference #9, including page number.

See also
 Bibliography
 Ibid.
 Op. cit.
 MLA style

References
Conventions in footnoting for essays, papers and books by Werner Hammerstingl, 1998.
Introduction to bibliographies and citation styles

Bibliography
Latin literary phrases